The 1975 North Dakota State Bison football team was an American football team that represented North Dakota State University during the 1975 NCAA Division II football season as a member of the North Central Conference. In their third year under head coach Ev Kjelbertson, the team compiled a 2–7 record.

Schedule

References

North Dakota State
North Dakota State Bison football seasons
North Dakota State Bison football